The Sebastian County Courthouse/Fort Smith City Hall is a historic civic building at 100 South 6th Street in Fort Smith, Arkansas.  It is a large four-story stone and concrete structure with modest Art Deco styling, designed by Fort Smith architects E. Chester Nelson, T. E. Bassham, and Carnall Wheeler and  built in 1937 with funding from the Public Works Administration.  Its interior lobby and courthouse spaces are richly decorated, with marble walls, terrazzo marble flooring, and ornamental moldings around doorways.  The building continues to house county facilities; the city offices are now located on Garrison Avenue.

The building was listed on the National Register of Historic Places in 1993.

See also
National Register of Historic Places listings in Sebastian County, Arkansas

References

Courthouses on the National Register of Historic Places in Arkansas
Art Deco architecture in Arkansas
Government buildings completed in 1937
Buildings and structures in Fort Smith, Arkansas
City halls in Arkansas
National Register of Historic Places in Sebastian County, Arkansas
City and town halls on the National Register of Historic Places in Arkansas
Courthouses in Arkansas